Countdown is a popular Dutch music television program which was broadcast by the public broadcasting system Veronica from 1978 to 1994. It ranked as the top music television programs in all of Europe. Due the popularity of the program, one of its hosts, Adam Curry, became a celebrity. Other hosts included Simone Walraven, Jasper Faber, Erik de Zwart and Wessel van Diepen.

A special English-language edition of Countdown was produced for pan-European music channel Music Box in 1987, with presenters Adam Curry and Erik de Zwart.

References

1978 Dutch television series debuts
1994 Dutch television series endings
Dutch music television series
1970s Dutch television series
1980s Dutch television series
1990s Dutch television series
Dutch-language television shows
NPO 2 original programming